Armando António dos Santos Manhiça (born 12 April 1943 - deceased 12 September 2009) was a Portuguese footballer who played as defender.

External links 
 
 

1943 births
2009 deaths
Portuguese footballers
Mozambican footballers
Association football defenders
Primeira Liga players
Sporting CP footballers
FC Porto players
Portugal international footballers